A general-purpose language is a computer language that is broadly applicable across application domains, and lacks specialized features for a particular domain. This is in contrast to a domain-specific language (DSL), which is specialized to a particular application domain. The line is not always sharp, as a language may have specialized features for a particular domain but be applicable more broadly, or conversely may in principle be capable of broad application but in practice used primarily for a specific domain.

General-purpose languages are further subdivided by the kind of language, and include:
 General-purpose markup languages, such as XML
 General-purpose modeling language such as the Unified Modeling Language (UML)
 General-purpose programming languages, such as C, Java, PHP, or Python

References

External links 
 

Programming language classification